Up in the Air Forever is the third studio album by Australian nu metal band Ocean Grove. it was released on 22 April 2022 through UNFD Records.

Background and release

Singles 
Four singles were released ahead of the album. The lead single, "Cali Sun" was released on 8 November 2021. On 18 January 2022, the band released their second single, "Silver Lining". The third single, "Sex Dope Gold", came out on 23 February 2022. The fourth single, "Bored" came out on 21 April 2022.

Track listing

Charts

References 

2022 albums
Ocean Grove (Australian band) albums
UNFD albums